, son of regent Kaneka, was a Japanese kugyō (court noble) of the Edo period (1603–1868). He held regent positions kampaku from 1746 to 1747 and from 1755 to 1757, and sesshō from 1747 to 1755.

He married an adopted daughter of Ikeda Tsugumasa, third head of Okayama Domain. She gave birth to, among others, Ichijō Teruyoshi and a daughter who later became a consort of Tokugawa Harumori, sixth head of Mito Domain

Family
 Father: Ichijo Kaneka
 Mother: commoner
 Wife: Ikeda Shizuko
 Children:
 Ichijo Teruyoshi by Shizuko
 Yoshiko married Tokugawa Harumori by Shizuko
 Sadako married Koga Nobumichi by Shizuko
 Priestess in Sanbō-in by Shizuko
 2 daughters and 4 sons died in infancy by Shizuko

References

 

1722 births
1769 deaths
Fujiwara clan
Ichijō family